The 1908–09 Chicago Maroons men's basketball team represented the University of Chicago in intercollegiate basketball during the 1908–09 season. The team finished the season with a 12–0 record and was retroactively named the national champion by the Helms Athletic Foundation and the Premo-Porretta Power Poll. This was the third consecutive season for which Chicago was later named the Helms national champion. The team played their home games on campus at Frank Dickinson Bartlett Gymnasium.

Both Pat Page and John Schommer were named All-Americans, while Schommer was also named the Helms Foundation National Player of the Year. For Schommer, it was his fourth consecutive All-American honor; for Page, it was his second (the following season, he would earn his third and also be named the Helms Foundation College Basketball Player of the Year).

Roster

Head Coach: Joseph Raycroft (3rd year at Chicago)

Schedule
Source											

|-	

|- align="center" bgcolor=""

|-

Awards and honors
John Schommer
Helms Foundation National Player of the Year
All-American
Pat Page
All-American

References

Chicago Maroons men's basketball seasons
NCAA Division I men's basketball tournament championship seasons
Chicago
Chicago Maroons Men's Basketball Team
Chicago Maroons Men's Basketball Team